"Green Lights" is a song by American artist Aloe Blacc, with music and lyrics by Jeffrey Scott Silverman, Leon Marcus Michels, Nicholas Anthony Movshon, E. Nathaniel Dawkins and produced by Leon Michels and Jeff Dynamite. It was released on 9 September 2011 as a Digital download in the United Kingdom. It has peaked to number 130 on the UK Singles Chart.

Music video
A music video to accompany the release of "Green Lights" was first released onto YouTube on 12 August 2011 at a total length of three minutes and twelve seconds.

Credits and personnel
Lead vocals – Aloe Blacc
Producers – Leon Michels, Jeff Dynamite
Lyrics – Jeffrey Scott Silverman, Leon Marcus Michels, Nicholas Anthony Movshon, E. Nathaniel Dawkins
Label: Stones Throw Records

Track listings
Promo CD single 
 "Green Lights" - 2:54

Digital download
 "Green Lights" - 2:56
 "Green Lights" (Future Fitz Radio Mix) - 3:11
 "Green Lights" (Grand Scheme Mix) - 2:55
 "Green Lights" (Jack Beats Remix) - 4:11
 "Green Lights" (Wideboys Remix) - 6:37

Chart performance

Release history

References 

2011 singles
Aloe Blacc songs
2011 songs
Songs written by Aloe Blacc